The term universal curve is used:

 In the mathematical field of fractals and curves: Menger sponge
 To describe the Inelastic mean free path of electrons in solids.
 A universal object for the moduli of curves.